Gisela Kallenbach (born 28 March 1944, in Soldin, New March, now Myślibórz, Poland) is a German politician. She was a Member of the European Parliament for Alliance '90/The Greens, part of the European Greens, from 2004 to 2009. Since 2009, she has been a member of the Parliament of Saxony. From 2000 to 2003, she was International Mayor of the United Nations Interim Administration Mission in Kosovo. She was awarded the Order of Merit of the Federal Republic of Germany in 2001.

Due to her family background and Christian faith, she was denied the right to go to Gymnasium and take the Abitur by the East German communist regime. She eventually became an engineer and an English translator. From 1990 to 2000, she worked as an adviser for the city of Leipzig's environmental administration. She became involved in local politics for the Greens in 1990.

She is involved with the Zeitzeugenportal, an initiative of the Bundesstiftung zur Aufarbeitung der SED-Diktatur, a signatory of the Prague Declaration on European Conscience and Communism, and also co-organized (with Milan Horáček) a public hearing in the European Parliament on totalitarian regimes in support of the declaration. She is also a supporter of the Freiheit statt Angst demonstrations concerned with citizens' data privacy.

References

1944 births
Living people
People from Myślibórz
People from the Province of Brandenburg
MEPs for Germany 2004–2009
21st-century women MEPs for Germany
Alliance 90/The Greens MEPs
Recipients of the Cross of the Order of Merit of the Federal Republic of Germany
Members of the Landtag of Saxony